HMS Nubian was a Royal Navy . She was launched in 1909 and torpedoed in 1916. With her bow blown off, the wreck was used to create a new ship by joining the bow of another destroyer of the same class, . The resulting ship was given the portmanteau name . She went on to sink the U-boat  in 1918 and was scrapped in 1919.

Commissioning
Nubian was launched on 20 April 1909, her keel plate having been laid down on 18 May 1908 at the Thornycroft yard in Woolston, Southampton. The ship was commissioned for service in the First Destroyer Flotilla by Commander Colin McKenzie at Sheerness on 3 September 1909. Steam trials had taken place at the mouth of the Thames in June of that year.

Movements
The First Destroyer Flotilla was based at Harwich with the purpose of defending Britain's east coast. It was planned to include 12 ocean-going destroyers capable of 33 knots.

The flotilla was present at a gathering of the Royal Navy fleet near to Penzance in July 1910 and in September that year Nubian had her annual refit at Chatham Dockyard. In March 1911, she and other members of the flotilla moved from Harwich to Portland, while the Second Destroyer Flotilla moved away from there to Plymouth. She was at Kirkwall in May 1911 and took part in the huge naval review at Spithead in June.

Nubian had a refit and basin trials of her machinery at Chatham in May 1912 before joining the Fourth Destroyer Flotilla at Portland for exercises in the English Channel. Together with fellow Fourth Destroyer Flotilla Tribal-class ships  and Zulu, and the cruiser  from the Second Squadron, Nubian sailed up the Manchester Ship Canal on 24 May that year to take part in a Whitsuntide display at the city. Most sources say that a smaller ship, Hope, was in attendance but some say that it was the battleship . Mooring at Trafford Wharf, members of the public were allowed to board the ships over three days. The visit coincided with Empire Day and generated much excitement, with 80,000 people visiting the docks on a single day and an estimated 100,000 being turned away due to overcrowding.

Another refit took place at Chatham in September 1912 and it returned there in December. A visit to Sheerness with the Fourth Destroyer Flotilla followed prior to the group returning to its Portland base in January 1913. Nubian had come top of its class in the 1912 battle practice (long range firing under war conditions), scoring 102 points.

Some of the flotilla, including Nubian, visited Bantry Bay and Queenstown in February 1913 during exercises. They returned to Sheerness and then to Chatham in March. The ship took part in further exercises later that year, at Fortrose and at Longhope, Orkney, before returning to Portland. In November, she acted as a tow for kites being used as targets in anti-aircraft gun tests at Needles Battery on the Isle of Wight, where her speed was remarked on. The Admiralty reported that she was among the top placed ships of that year's battle practice.

By February 1914, Nubian and seven other Tribal-class destroyers were part of the Third Destroyer Flotilla but none were so for long. In May 1914, Nubian became a tender for the gunnery establishment .

A month later, it was reported that she had been among many ships that participated in a bombardment of German positions on the coast of Belgium during October–November 1914.

Torpedoing and reconstruction

During the Battle of Dover Strait, on the night of 26–27 October 1916 off Folkestone Nubians bow was almost severed by a German torpedo that exploded almost under her bridge. She was taken in tow but the tow-ropes severed in the bad weather conditions and she ran aground on the South Foreland, near Dover. The bow then parted completely on a chalk reef and the remainder of the ship was driven under a cliff. Two of the crew of Nubian died and a further thirteen were missing, believed killed.

Nubian was eventually refloated when a cutting was blasted through the rocks. Another Tribal-class destroyer, Zulu, had her stern blown off by a naval mine near Dunkirk on 8 November 1916 and was towed to Calais. Both wrecks were towed to Chatham Dockyard and Zulus bow was joined to the midsection and stern of Nubian. The resulting destroyer was given the portmanteau name Zubian. This ship served until the end of the war, sinking the mine-laying U-boat  on 4 February 1918 off the coast of Essex.

Fate
Zubian was broken up at Sunderland in 1919.

Notes

Citations

Bibliography
 
 
 
 
 
 

 

Tribal-class destroyers (1905)
Ships built in Southampton
1909 ships
World War I destroyers of the United Kingdom
Maritime incidents in 1916
Ships built by John I. Thornycroft & Company